Brunelleschi is a crater on Mercury. Its name was adopted by the International Astronomical Union (IAU) in 1976. Brunelleschi is named for the Italian architect Filippo Brunelleschi, who lived from 1377 to 1446.

Views

References

Filippo Brunelleschi
Impact craters on Mercury